The Referee is a 1922 American silent sports drama film directed by Ralph Ince and starring Conway Tearle, Anders Randolf and Gladys Hulette.

Cast
 Conway Tearle as John McArdle
 Anders Randolf as Steve Roberts
 Gladys Hulette as Janie Roberts
 Gus Platz as Fighter
 Frank Ryan as Fighter
 Joe Humphries as Announcer
 Patsy Haley as Referee

References

Bibliography
 Goble, Alan. The Complete Index to Literary Sources in Film. Walter de Gruyter, 1999.

External links
 

1922 films
1920s sports films
American silent feature films
American boxing films
American black-and-white films
Selznick Pictures films
Films directed by Ralph Ince
1920s English-language films
1920s American films
Silent sports films